A tree view or an outline view is a graphical control element that presents a hierarchical view of information. Each item (often called a branch or a node) can have a number of subitems. This is often visualized by indentation in a list.

An item can be expanded to reveal subitems, if any exist, and collapsed to hide subitems.

Tree views are often seen in file manager applications, where they allow the user to navigate the file system directories. They are also used to present hierarchical data, such as an XML document.

Extended tree view is the central component of outliner applications, where each node consists of editable text.

See also
 Directory (file systems) - an example of application of tree views
 File manager
 Genealogy software

External links

 Treeview in pure HTML+CSS
 Tree view widget in the GTK+ API
 Tree view control in the Win32 API (MSDN)
 Yahoo! UI Library y
 Extended TreeView for .NET WinForms
 TreeView Control in ASP.NET 2.0
 Interview with Henk Hagedoorn, developer of first tree-view PIM

Graphical control elements